Tuanku Bujang bin Tuanku Othman (12 December 1898 – 28 November 1986) was the second Yang di-Pertua Negeri of Sarawak (Governor of Sarawak) from 1969 to 1977.

Early life
Born to a renowned Malay family in Sibu with distant Hadhrami Arab ancestry, he was educated in a Malay school and later joined the Sarawak Civil Service as a Native Officer in 1934. 
He was awarded the title of "Datu" in June 1954, and a year later was promoted to Sarawak Administrative Service as an officer and he later retired from Sarawak Government Civil Service in December 1960.

Political career
After his retirement from the Civil Service, he became the president of Barisan Ra'ayat Jati Sarawak (BARJASA) in 1962, a political party in favour of the formation of Malaysia. After the establishment of Malaysia, he was appointed as senator in 1963, and was awarded Panglima Setia Mahkota (P.S.M.), which carries the title "Tan Sri" by the Malaysian Government.

Appointment as the Yang di-Pertua Negeri
He was appointed as the second Yang di-Pertua Negeri (Governor of Sarawak) by the King of Malaysia upon the death of the former governor, Tun Abang Haji Openg. Upon the appointment, he was awarded Seri Maharaja Mangku Negara (S.M.N.), which carried the title "Tun". He would serve as the governor for the second term in 1973, before his term ended in 1977.

Post-governorship and death
Little is known about his doing after his tenure as the governor of Sarawak ended in 1977. On 28 November 1986, he died peacefully in Kuching, where he was buried.

Honours

Honours of Malaysia
  : 
 Recipient of the Malaysian Commemorative Medal (Silver) (PPM) (1965)
  Commander of the Order of Loyalty to the Crown of Malaysia (PSM) – Tan Sri  (1967)
  Grand Commander of the Order of the Defender of the Realm (SMN) – Tun (1970)
  :
  Knight Grand Commander of the Order of the Star of Hornbill Sarawak (DP) – Datuk Patinggi
  :
  Grand Commander of the Order of Kinabalu (SPDK) –  Datuk Seri Panglima

Places named after him
 Kolej Tun Datu Tuanku Haji Bujang, Miri (Tuanku Haji Bujang College, Miri) - previously known as Tanjong Lobang Secondary School and Tanjong Lobang College
 Padang Sukan Tun Datuk Patinggi Tuanku Haji Bujang in Bukit Lima Sports Complex, Sibu.
 Sibu Townsquare Phase 1, Sibu
 Arena Tun Tuanku Haji Bujang Sports Complex, Universiti Malaysia Sarawak, Samarahan

References

 Who's Who Sarawak 82/83 (First Edition), Sarawak Publishing House Sdn.Bhd.

B
Hadhrami people
Yang di-Pertua Negeri of Sarawak
Parti Pesaka Bumiputera Bersatu politicians
Members of the Dewan Negara
People from Sarawak
Malaysian Muslims
Malaysian people of Malay descent
Commanders of the Order of Loyalty to the Crown of Malaysia
Grand Commanders of the Order of the Defender of the Realm
1898 births
1986 deaths